Telephus Euergetes (Euergetes means "the Benefactor") was a late Indo-Greek king who seems to have been one of the weak and brief successors of Maues. Bopearachchi dates Telephus between 75–70 BCE and places him in Gandhara, Senior to c. 60 BCE and suggests that he ruled in some parts of Pushkalavati or even further west.

Nothing is known about his dynastic connections. His few coins are rather singular and none of them bear his likeness, a rare occurrence in Indo-Greek coinage. Despite his Greek name, Telephus might therefore have been a ruler of Saka origin. His epithet was also unprecedented.

Coinage
The silver coinage of Telephus is rare and mostly consists of drachms; only a few tetradrachms are known. On the Greek side is a serpent-footed monster holding the stems of two plants, and on the Kharoshthi side two deities that probably should be identified with Helios and Selene, the sun and moon. Both types were unique in the area, though the monster would later appear on bronzes of Hippostratus.

An example of one of his bronzes is seen above, The obverse is the common type of sitting Zeus making a benediction gesture, whereas on the reverse is the unique type of a squatting man holding what on some specimens looks like a spear, on others a palm branch.

Telephus used only two monograms, which he inherited from Maues.

Overstrikes
Telephos overstruck the earlier king Archebius.

See also
 Greco-Bactrian Kingdom
 Greco-Buddhism
 Indo-Scythians
 Indo-Parthian Kingdom
 Kushan Empire

References
 The Greeks in Bactria and India, W. W. Tarn, Cambridge University Press.
 The Coin Types of the Indo-Greek Kings, 256-54 B.C., A. K. Narain.

External links
Coins of Telephus

Indo-Greek kings
1st-century BC rulers in Asia